D. Devaraj Urs was the Council of Ministers in Karnataka, a state in South India headed by D. Devaraj Urs of the Indian National Congress (Indira).

The ministry had multiple  ministers including the Chief Minister. All ministers belonged to the Indian National Congress (Indira).

D. Devaraj Urs became Chief minister of Karnataka after Indian National Congress (Indira) emerged victorious 1978 elections.

Chief Minister & Cabinet Ministers

Minister of State

See also 

 Karnataka Legislative Assembly

References 

Cabinets established in 1978
1978 establishments in Karnataka
1980 disestablishments in India
Devaraj Urs
Indian National Congress state ministries
Indian Congress (Socialist) state ministries
Cabinets disestablished in 1980
1978 in Indian politics